The Blue Villa (French title: Un bruit qui rend fou, A noise that renders one crazy or A maddening noise) is a 1995 French crime thriller film, directed by Alain Robbe-Grillet and starring Fred Ward. It was entered into the 45th Berlin International Film Festival.

Plot 
Living on  an isolated Greek island are a few native Greeks; several Chinese who spend their days playing mahjong; Nordmann, a boozy screenwriter; and seductive Sarah la-Blonde, the madam at the Blue Villa, the town whorehouse, in which Sarah hides Santa, alias Lotus Blossom. Sarah is teaching Santa to sing an aria from Wagner. One day, Frank arrives on the island. At first, he does not speak and appears to be looking for something or someone. It is later learned that he was involved in the supposed death of Santa, who just might be Nordmann's daughter. It is up to the local police chief, Thieu, to figure out what parts of the story are true and what parts are fiction.

Cast 
Fred Ward - Frank
Arielle Dombasle - Sarah la-Blonde
Charles Tordjman - Edouard 'Nord' Nordmann
Sandrine Le Berre - Santa
Dimitris Poulikakos - Police chief Thieu
Christian Maillet - The father 
Muriel Jacobs - Kim
Michalis Maniatis - Mars

Notes

References

1995 films
1995 crime thriller films
1990s French-language films
Films directed by Alain Robbe-Grillet
French crime thriller films
Films shot in Hydra
1990s French films